Željko Adžić (also known as Jerry Adzic) (born 28 August 1965, in Požega) is a Croatian retired footballer.

Club career
He won the Prva HNL with HAŠK Građanski (Dinamo Zagreb) in 1993. While playing with Melbourne Croatia he won the Johnny Warren Medal. Left Australia shortly afterwards after allegedly engaging in relations with the 16-year-old daughter of a Melbourne Knights committee member.

International career
He played one game internationally for Croatia, a friendly match against Ukraine on 26 June 1993 scoring at Maksimir Stadium.

Career statistics

International goals

References

External links

1965 births
Living people
People from Požega, Croatia
Association football midfielders
Yugoslav footballers
Croatian footballers
Croatia international footballers
GNK Dinamo Zagreb players
Hamilton Croatia players
Hamilton Steelers (1981–1992) players
Melbourne Knights FC players
Hércules CF players
NK Hrvatski Dragovoljac players
NK Inter Zaprešić players
Hapoel Beit She'an F.C. players
Yugoslav First League players
Canadian National Soccer League players
Canadian Soccer League (1987–1992) players
National Soccer League (Australia) players
Croatian Football League players
Segunda División players
Liga Leumit players
Yugoslav expatriate footballers
Expatriate soccer players in Canada
Yugoslav expatriate sportspeople in Canada
Expatriate soccer players in Australia
Yugoslav expatriate sportspeople in Australia
Croatian expatriate footballers
Croatian expatriate sportspeople in Spain
Expatriate footballers in Spain
Croatian expatriate sportspeople in Israel
Expatriate footballers in Israel